Irish America is a bi-monthly periodical that aims to cover topics relevant to the Irish in North America including a range of political, economic, social, and cultural themes. The magazine’s inaugural issue was published in October 1985. Irish America focuses on political and business leaders, organizations, artists, writers and community figures among the Irish in America through its annual lists, awards, and events including the Wall Street 50, Business 100, and Stars of the South.

Irish America primary goals are to emphasize the achievements of Irish Americans in each bi-monthly issue, such as former U.S. president Bill Clinton, former U.S. Secretary of State Hillary Clinton, former president of Coca-Cola and chairman of Allen & Company Donald R. Keough, comedian Kathy Griffin, film actress Maureen O'Hara, political commentators Chris Matthews and Bill O'Reilly, and California governor Jerry Brown.

History 

Niall O'Dowd and Patricia Harty co-founded Irish America in 1985. Since then, it reports to have increased circulation to over 100,000 in the United States, Ireland and Northern Ireland. Its writers and correspondents aim to cover news events relevant to the Irish American community, through news stories, features, and interviews. Irish America has celebrated Irish Americans from the worlds of politics, music, movies, theater, business, dance, books and academia to appear on the covers of the magazine over the years.

Awards
Many awards are given to Irish Americans by the magazine. The top Irish American people of the year are recognized in the selection of the Top 100. The annual Wall Street 50 highlights the accomplishments of Irish Americans in the financial community, and there has been a Guest of Honor at every Wall Street 50 event. The Business 100, meanwhile, features 100 honorees and one guest of honor at a luncheon that happens annually.

From 2006 to 2011, Irish America magazine also honored the southern United States with the Stars of the South award. The honorees were feted at an annual celebratory dinner in Atlanta.

In 2010, Irish America magazine began inducting members into the Irish America Hall of Fame.

Online
Digital content from each issue and extras from between the issues can be found online.

References

External links
 IrishAmerica.com
 Chris Matthews Inducted into Irish American Hall of Fame
 Irish America Magazine and Financial Dynamics Host the Seventh Annual 'Wall Street 50' Gala
 Irish America Founder Honored at Book Party
 North-American Irish periodicals
 Interview with Patricia Harty

Bimonthly magazines published in the United States
Local interest magazines published in the United States
Irish-American press
Magazines established in 1985
Magazines published in New York (state)
1985 establishments in New York (state)